BCM may refer to:

Automotive
Body Control Module, in automotive electronics

Business
Boots Contract Manufacturing, part of Alliance Boots
Bravo Company Manufacturing, an American firearms manufacturing company
Bus contracting model of Singapore, a bus industry contracting model introduced in Singapore by the Land Transport Authority
Business Capability Model, a model showing what an organization can do
Business Contact Manager, a Microsoft add-in product for Microsoft Outlook|Microsoft Office Outlook that adds CRM features
Business Continuity Management, an interdisciplinary peer mentoring methodology used to create a plan for recovery of a business after disaster or disruption
Business Council of Mongolia, a business association in Mongolia
Broadcom Inc., designer, developer and global supplier of semiconductor products
Broadcom Corporation, subsidiary of Broadcom Inc.

Banks
Banque Centrale de Madagascar, a financial institution in Madagascar
Banque Centrale de Mauritanie, a financial institution in Mauritania
Banque Commerciale du Maroc, a financial institution in Morocco that is now the Attijariwafa Bank

Religion
Baptist Church of Mizoram
Baptist Collegiate Ministries, an entity of the Baptist Student Union at some American and Canadian colleges

Units of measure
Bank Cubic Metre (mining term), a cubic metre of rock or material in situ before it is extracted
Billion Cubic Microns per square inch, a unit used in printing that measures the amount of ink that an anilox roll delivers to a printing plate
Billion Cubic Metres, a unit of measure equivalent to 1 cubic kilometre, see also Orders of magnitude (one cubic kilometre to one cubic megametre)
Billion cubic metres of natural gas, one of the common measures used in the international energy trade

Science and medicine
Baylor College of Medicine, a private medical school in Houston, Texas, USA
BCM theory, a model of synaptic plasticity
Blue cone monochromacy, a rare form of color-blindness
British Chess Magazine, a magazine published in the United Kingdom
Bromochloromethane, a mixed halomethane

Other
 Bak chor mee, Mee pok served with minced meat, pork slices, pork liver (tur kwa), stewed sliced mushrooms, meat balls and bits of deep-fried lard
 Baker, Candlestickmaker, first volume of Butcher, a spin-off comic miniseries of The Boys, following Billy Butcher
 "Butcher, Baker, Candlestick Maker" (The Boys), television adaptation of the comic miniseries
 Band Corporal Major, a warrant officer appointment in the bands of the British Household Cavalry
 BCM, the IATA airport code for Bacău International Airport
 Beijing Capital Museum, an art museum in Beijing, China
 Binary chemical munition, a weapon requiring two separate media to combine for activation
 Black Consciousness Movement, a political  movement in apartheid South Africa
 Black Catholic Messenger, African-American Catholic newspaper